Sông Mã may refer to:

Mã River, a river in Vietnam and Laos
Sông Mã district, Sơn La province, Vietnam
Sông Mã (township) in Sông Mã district
Sông Mã Range along the border between Laos and Vietnam